Dealer/Healer is a 2017 Hong Kong-Chinese action crime drama film directed by Lawrence Ah Mon and starring Sean Lau, Gordon Lam and Jiang Yiyan, with special appearances by Louis Koo and Zhang Jin. The film is based on the story of former Hong Kong triad member, Peter Chan's recovery from drug addiction. Chan, who is portrayed in the film by Lau, served as one of the producers of the film. It was released in China on 12 May 2017 and in Hong Kong on 18 May 2017.

Plot
During the 1960s-70s in Hong Kong, when the police were corrupt and triads ruled the city, it was the glorious days for Chan Wah (Sean Lau), La Ba (Gordon Lam), Kitty (Zhang Jin) and their brothers. Chan, who was very arrogant, was regarded as the leader of the "Thirteen Naughty Children of Tsz Wan Shan". Chan later meets the love of his life, Ho-yau (Jiang Yiyan), and spent his sweetest times with her. However, good times do not as long as Chan was being hunted down for drug trafficking. Fortunately, Chan was able to escape from death with the help of his frienemy, Halley (Louis Koo), who is the leader of the Anti-Drug Unit of the police force, but was unable to escape from the law. After being released from prison, Chan's father died while Ho-yau went missing, causing him to greatly blame himself. Chan realized his past mistakes and is determined to turn over a new leaf. Not only does he actively participate in helping youths rehab from drugs, he was also awarded as one of the Ten Outstanding Young Persons of Hong Kong. He also influenced La Ba and Kitty to the right path and helped mediate disputes among the triads and garnered great respects from both the triads and the police. Once while attending a drug treatment lectures in Japan, Chan encounters Ho-yau and once again wants to be together with her.

Cast
Sean Lau as Chan Wah (陳華)
Gordon Lam as La Ba (喇叭)
Jiang Yiyan as Ho-yau (可柔)
Louis Koo as Halley (哈雷) (special appearance)
Zhang Jin as Kitty (貓仔) (special appearance)
Ng Man-tat
Patrick Tam
Lo Hoi-pang
Chen Kuan-tai
Billy Lau
Stephen Au
Ben Lam
Wan Yeung-ming
Nora Miao
David Lam
Jacqueline Chong
Justin Cheung
Deno Cheung
Raymond Chiu
Kevin Chu
Tang Yat-ming
Dave Lam
Sofiee Ng
Kelvin Chan
Cliff Chan
Lai Cheung-leung

Production
Production for the film began on 26 October 2015 at the Drug Rehabilitation Center of The New Being Christian Fellowship in Pak Tam Chung.

Reception
The film grossed  on its opening weekend in mainland China. It has grossed  there so far.

References

External links

2017 films
2017 crime drama films
2017 crime action films
Hong Kong crime action films
Hong Kong action drama films
2017 action drama films
Triad films
2010s Cantonese-language films
Films directed by Lawrence Ah Mon
Films about drugs
Drama films based on actual events
Films set in the 1960s
Films set in the 1970s
Films set in Hong Kong
Films shot in Hong Kong
Chinese crime drama films
Crime films based on actual events
2010s Hong Kong films